Queen Elizabeth Barracks is a military installation in Strensall, North Yorkshire, England.

History
The land that formed the common and Lord's Moor itself was bought in 1876 for £300,000 From the then lord of the manor, Leonard Thompson and other landowners. This arrangement was made permanent in 1884 through the Strensall Common Act. The Act was part of the response of the Government to the Cardwell Reforms, a series of reforms of the British Army by Secretary of State for War Edward Cardwell between 1868 and 1874 designed to put the British Army on a more professional footing and to create reserve forces stationed around the country. The main purpose of the Act was stated as:

Though the Ministry of Defence exercises all legal rights over all of the training area, the Act of 1884 enshrines the rights of civilians to have common access rights when not in use for military purposes.
When training commenced, it was home to up to 8,0000 soldiers under canvas, until permanent buildings were erected in 1880. The camp was an important mustering point for troops prior to mobilisation for the First World War. During the second World War, the camp was also the training ground for the local Haxby and Wiggington Home Guard.

The barracks were renamed Queen Elizabeth Barracks in the 1950s and went on to become the regional centre for infantry training as the Yorkshire Brigade Depôt in 1960. This followed the 1957 Defence Review that resulted in the amalgamation of a number of battalions and regiments and the renaming of the Yorkshire and Northumberland Brigade to be simply the Yorkshire Brigade. 

The barracks then became the depot of the King's Division in 1968 following the unification of the Yorkshire Brigade with the Lancastrian and North Irish Brigades. Recruit basic training included drill, weapons training, fieldcraft as well as recreational opportunities before passing out.

On 11 June 1974, the Provisional Irish Republican Army planted and exploded devices at the camp, though there was no loss of life.

In November 2016, the Ministry of Defence announced that the site would close in 2021. This was subsequently extended to 2024.

Site details
The current site has capacity for a turnover of 120,000 accommodation spaces to be used in each training year. There is separate messing facilities for Junior Ranks, Senior Non Commissioned Officers and Officers. Other facilities include workshops, Motor Transport garage and offices. Entrance to the site is from Strensall Road which forms the western boundary of the camp. A number of sporting facilities are also on site and include grass pitches for Football, Rugby, Hockey and Cricket. Like a number of military establishments, the barracks has its own church, St Wilfred's.

The geology of the site consists of a bedrock of Sherwood Sandstone. There are drift deposits that belong to the Sutton Sand Formation.

Current units
Current units at the site are:
Army Training Unit (North East)
1st (United Kingdom) Divisional Training Advisory Team (DTAT)
Headquarters, Yorkshire (North and West) Army Cadet Force
Strensall Detachment, B Company, Yorkshire (North and West) Army Cadet Force
4 Infantry Brigade Cadet Training Team
Headquarters, 2nd Medical Brigade
 Medical Operational Support Group, Royal Army Medical Corps (V)
 34th Field Hospital, Royal Army Medical Corps
 306th Hospital Support Regiment, Royal Army Medical Corps (V)
 335th Medical Evacuation Regiment, Royal Army Medical Corps (V)
 Central Reserve Headquarters, Royal Army Medical Corps (V)
 Army Medical Service Training Centre

References

Installations of the British Army
Barracks in England